The Mull of Galloway is the southernmost point of Scotland. It is situated in Wigtownshire, Dumfries and Galloway, at the end of the Rhins of Galloway peninsula.

The Mull has one of the last remaining sections of natural coastal habitat on the Galloway coast and as such supports a wide variety of plant and animal species. It is now a nature reserve managed by the RSPB. Mull means rounded headland or promontory.

Lighthouse

An active lighthouse is positioned at the point. The lighthouse and lighthouse keepers' houses are designated as a Category A listed building.

During World War II, on 8 June 1944 at 7.30 pm, a French member of the British Air Transport Auxiliary (ATA), Cladius Echallier, died by striking the Lighthouse in a Beaufighter, while making a low landfall from the Irish Sea.

The lighthouse is now automatic, and an old outhouse has been converted into a visitor centre, run by the South Rhins Community Development Trust, a group of local people and businesses. In 2013 there was a community buyout and the Mull of Galloway Trust purchased land and buildings, with the exception of the tower, from Northern Lighthouse Board.

In 2004 a new café was built at the Mull of Galloway, called the "Gallie Craig". Its design incorporates into the landscape with a turf roof, giving views across to Northern Ireland and southwards to the Isle of Man.

See also

 List of lighthouses in Scotland
 List of Northern Lighthouse Board lighthouses
 Dunnet Head - Scotland's most northerly point on the mainland
 Corrachadh Mòr - Scotland's most westerly point on the mainland
 Keith Inch - Scotland's most easterly point on the mainland

References

External links
 Northern Lighthouse Board 
 Area website
 Webcam of the views from the lighthouse 
 Profile on VisitScotland website

Headlands of Scotland
Wigtownshire
Sites of Special Scientific Interest in Wigtown and Stewartry
Royal Society for the Protection of Birds reserves in Scotland
Landforms of Dumfries and Galloway
Protected areas of Dumfries and Galloway
Rhins of Galloway